Fărcaș is a commune in Dolj County, Oltenia, Romania with a population of 3,590 people. It is composed of five villages: Amărăști, Fărcaș, Golumbelu, Golumbu and Plopu-Amărăști. It included five other villages until 2004, when they were split off to form Tălpaș Commune.

References

Communes in Dolj County
Localities in Oltenia